Doepke is a surname. Notable people with the surname include:

Connie Doepke (born 1946), American politician
Matthias Doepke, German economist

See also
Alms and Doepke Dry Goods Company